Elections to Liverpool City Council were held on 10 May 1973.

Following boundary changes, which reduced the number of wards from 40 to 33, three councillors were elected for each ward.

After the election, the composition of the council was:

Election result

Ward results

* - Councillor seeking re-election

(PARTY) - Party of former Councillor

Abercromby, St. James'

Aigburth

Allerton

Anfield

Arundel

Breckfield, St. Domingo

Broadgreen

Central, Everton, Netherfield

Childwall

Church

Clubmoor

County

Croxteth

Dingle

Dovecot

Fairfield

Fazakerley

Gillmoss

Granby, Prince's Park

Kensington

Low Hill, Smithdown

Melrose, Westminster

Old Swan

Picton

Pirrie

St. Mary's

St. Michael's

Sandhills, Vauxhall

Speke

Tuebrook

Warbreck

Woolton, East

Woolton, West

By Elections

Low Hill, Smithdown and Speke held on 21 March 1974, before the AGM of April 1st.

Low Hill, Smithdown

Speke

St Michael’s

Council Leadership

This would come into effect on 1 April 1974.

References

1973
Liverpool City Council election
City Council election, 1973
Liverpool City Council election